The Standard was an Italian automobile manufactured from 1906 until 1908 by the Fabbrica Automobili Standard of Torino.  The company produced a 10/14 hp four-cylinder which was sometimes marketed under the name FAS.

References
David Burgess Wise, The New Illustrated Encyclopedia of Automobiles.

Defunct motor vehicle manufacturers of Italy